Edaphobacter modestus is a species of bacteria. It is the type species of the genus Edaphobacter and was originally isolated from an alpine soil sample rich in calcium carbonate.

References

External links
Type strain of Edaphobacter modestus at BacDive -  the Bacterial Diversity Metadatabase

Acidobacteriota
Acidophiles
Bacteria described in 2008